Granvin Station is a former railway station on the Hardanger Line, located at Granvin, Norway.

References

Railway stations in Voss
1935 establishments in Norway
Railway stations opened in 1935
Disused railway stations in Norway

Year of disestablishment missing